Rattlesnake Gutter is a scenic boulder filled chasm, 3/4 mile long and 1/8 mile wide, located in Leverett, Massachusetts. The origins of the gutter are uncertain, but theories include:

 A subglacial meltwater channel
 A tear at the site of an old geologic fault. 
 A spillway for  a temporary proglacial lake.

An important ecological habitat, the property is under conservation stewardship. The Metacomet-Monadnock Trail passes near the gutter.

Recreation
This chasm is along a short section of the Metacomet-Monadnock Trail just south of the Leverett COOP near Shutesbury Road.

References
 http://www.science.smith.edu/departments/Geology/5Cgeology/Students/Abstracts01/Greenwood.pdf

Landforms of Franklin County, Massachusetts
Rock formations of Massachusetts
Open space reserves of Massachusetts
Protected areas of Franklin County, Massachusetts